Harald Normann (15 February 1893 – 18 June 1978) was a Norwegian military officer and non-fiction writer. He was born in Steinkjer. From 1936 he was in command of the Norwegian Army Air Service's "jageving", and from 1939 he chaired the flying school at Kjeller. Among his books are Normalflyvning og snittflyvning from 1930, Luftkamp from 1934, Vollgraven from 1955, and Hvordan gikk det til? from 1962.

References

1893 births
1978 deaths
People from Steinkjer
Norwegian expatriates in France
Norwegian expatriates in the United Kingdom
Norwegian expatriates in the Netherlands
Norwegian expatriates in Italy
Norwegian non-fiction writers
Norwegian Army personnel
Norwegian Army Air Service personnel of World War II
Norwegian World War II pilots
Norwegian prisoners and detainees
Prisoners and detainees of Norway
Norwegian prisoners of war in World War II
World War II prisoners of war held by Germany
Overturned convictions
Norwegian farmers
20th-century non-fiction writers